The men's heptathlon event  at the 1994 European Athletics Indoor Championships was held in Palais Omnisports de Paris-Bercy on 12 and 13 March.

Results

References

Combined events at the European Athletics Indoor Championships
Heptathlon